The 1988 NCAA Division I softball season, play of college softball in the United States organized by the National Collegiate Athletic Association (NCAA) at the Division I level, began in February 1988.  The season progressed through the regular season, many conference tournaments and championship series, and concluded with the 1988 NCAA Division I softball tournament and 1988 Women's College World Series.  The Women's College World Series, consisting of the eight remaining teams in the NCAA Tournament and held in Sunnyvale, California at ASA Hall of Fame Stadium, ended on May 29, 1988.

Conference standings

Women's College World Series
The 1988 NCAA Women's College World Series took place from May 25 to May 29, 1988 in Sunnyvale, California.

Season leaders
Batting
Batting average: .484 – Jill Justin, Northern Illinois Huskies
RBIs: 59 – Dori Beach, Charleston Southern Buccaneers
Home runs: 9 – Luevenia Moore, Florida A&M Lady Rattlers & Michele Smith, Oklahoma State Cowgirls

Pitching
Wins: 50-8 – Debbie Nichols, Louisiana Tech Lady Techsters
ERA: 0.29 (11 ER/259.1 IP) – Lisa Longaker, UCLA Bruins
Strikeouts: 294 – Debby Day, UTA Mavericks

Records
NCAA Division I season shutouts:
36 – Debbie Nichols, Louisiana Tech Lady Techsters

NCAA Division I season assists:
237 – Charis Monroe, Cal State Fullerton Titans

Freshman class triples:
13 – Tricia Popowski, South Carolina Gamecocks

Freshman class assists:
230 – Julie Standering, Arizona Wildcats

Sophomore class assists:
229 – Carie Dever, Fresno State Bulldogs

Sophomore class wins:
50 – Debbie Nichols, Louisiana Tech Lady Techsters

Junior class innings pitched:
425.0 – Julie Carpenter, Texas A&M Aggies

Awards
Honda Sports Award Softball:
Lisa Longaker, UCLA Bruins

All America Teams
The following players were members of the All-American Teams.

First Team

Second Team

References